Steel Will is a 2022 Chinese drama film directed by  and starring Liu Ye, Han Xue, Lin Yongjian, and Zhang Guoqiang. The film was theatrically released on 30 September 2022.

Cast
Liu Ye as Zhao Tiechi, head of Ansteel Group.
Han Xue as Sun Xuefei, an engineer.
Lin Yongjian as 
Zhang Guoqiang as Cheng Shixun
Li Pei'en as Wang Chonglun

Soundtrack

Release
Steel Will was released on 30 September 2022, in China.

References

External links

2022 films
2020s Mandarin-language films
Chinese drama films
Films shot in Liaoning
Films set in Liaoning
2022 drama films